Aino Aleksandra Lehtokoski (6 June 1886, Maaria – 14 October 1949, Helsinki) was a Finnish economic adviser and a Social Democrat Member of Parliament for 30 years.

Life 
She joined the Social Democratic Party in 1904 as well as the socialist democrat in the sobriety movement. She also lectured at the Confederation of Consumer Cooperatives from 1925 to 1933.

Parliamentarian 
Lehtokoski, who served in Finland's parliament from 1919 to her death in 1949, was Finland's fourth longest-serving female MP behind Sirkka-Liisa Anttila, After Miina Sillanpää and Aino Malkamäki. Lehtokoski received the title of economic adviser in 1949.

As a member of the Socialist Democratic Party, she represented the southern constituency of Turku County. She was the Presidential Elector in the presidential elections of 1925, 1931, 1937, 1940 and 1943. She was also a member of the Ulvila Municipal Council. Lehtokoski was a member of the federal committees of the Social Democratic Workers' Women's Union and the Sobriety Union. She was also on the advisory committees on maintenance and sobriety and alcohol. 

She also held other civic positions.

 Federal Committee of the Social Democratic Workers' Union
 Board of the Prohibition Act
 Federal Commission for Socialist Sobriety
 Joint Committee of Sobriety Organizations
 The host of the Helsinki Workers' Savings Bank
 Board of Governors of the Workers' Academy

Personal life 
Lehtokoski's parents were carpenter Frans Fredrik Malm and Eeva Stiina Tienhaara and she was born in 1886 in Maaria, which is now part of the city of Turku, Finland. She had only an elementary school education and in 1897 she found work as a servant. 

In 1910, she married Aksel Valdemar Lehtokoski. 

Aino Lehtokoski died in the autumn of 1949 in Helsinki during her term in Parliament and was succeeded there by Yrjö Helenius.

References

External links 
 Group photo at Yläne Workers' House

   

1886 births
1949 deaths
People from Turku
Women government ministers of Finland
Women members of the Parliament of Finland
Social Democratic Party of Finland politicians
Finnish people of World War II
Members of the Parliament of Finland (1910–11)
Members of the Parliament of Finland (1939–45)
Members of the Parliament of Finland (1945–48)